The McDonnell Douglas High Speed Civil Transport was a proposed supersonic airliner design that was the subject of internal and NASA contract studies in 1996. It was envisioned at a time when the company was struggling to compete in the commercial aviation market and would ultimately never progress beyond a paper design.

Design goals envisioned a 300-passenger capacity with a 5,000 nautical mile range. Projected cruise speed was between Mach 1.6 and Mach 2.4.

Design and development
McDonnell Douglas conducted internal and NASA contract studies to determine the market  requirements for a High Speed Civil Transport (HSCT) and resolve environmental, economic and technical issues. "McDD is participating in an international study group exploring the HSCT concept, with Aerospatiale, Boeing, British Aerospace Daimler-Benz, Japan Aircraft Industries, Alenia and Tupolev."

A first flight was envisioned for 2003, with certification projected in 2005–2006. A market for between 500 and 1,500 was also forecast. In the event, none were built and the aircraft remained a paper project. A conceptual design illustration showed a long narrow fuselage with four podded engines under sharply raked fixed delta wings mounted low at mid-fuselage and a swept cruciform tail, looking not unlike the cancelled Boeing 2707.

References

Abandoned civil aircraft projects of the United States
Quadjets
High Speed Civil Transport
Low-wing aircraft
Supersonic transports